Callizzia certiorara is a species of scoopwing moth in the family Uraniidae. It is found in North America.

The MONA or Hodges number for Callizzia certiorara is 7651.

References

Further reading

External links

 

Uraniidae
Articles created by Qbugbot
Moths described in 1906